Andrew Johnson Cummins (December 6, 1868 – September 15, 1923) was a sergeant serving in the United States Army during the Spanish–American War who received the Medal of Honor for bravery.

Biography
Cummins was born December 6, 1868, in Alexandria, Indiana, and joined the Army from Columbus, Ohio, in January 1891. He served in the Spanish–American War with Company F, 10th U.S. Infantry as a sergeant, and received the Medal of Honor for assisting in the rescue of wounded while under enemy fire. He was discharged in January 1899.

Cummins died September 15, 1923, and is buried in Lewistown City Cemetery Lewistown, Montana.

Medal of Honor citation
Rank and organization: Sergeant, Company F, 10th U.S. Infantry. Place and date: At Santiago, Cuba, 1 July 1898. Entered service at: __. Birth: Alexandria, Ind. Date of issue: 22 June 1899.

Citation:

Gallantly assisted in the rescue of the wounded from in front of the lines and under heavy fire of the enemy.

See also

List of Medal of Honor recipients for the Spanish–American War

References

External links

1868 births
1923 deaths
United States Army Medal of Honor recipients
United States Army soldiers
American military personnel of the Spanish–American War
Burials in Montana
People from Alexandria, Indiana
Spanish–American War recipients of the Medal of Honor